This is a list of characters from the manga and drama series, Hana-Kimi, known in Japan as  written by Hisaya Nakajo.

The series centers on Mizuki Ashiya, a Japanese girl who lives in the United States. She sees a track and field competition on TV and becomes attracted to one of the high jump competitors, Izumi Sano. She begins to idolize the young athlete and eventually transfers to Japan to attend the same school that Sano attends. As Mizuki is a girl, she must disguise herself to enter Osaka Gakuen, an all-boys school.

Students of the First Dormitory
Classes that belong to this dormitory are 1-A, 2-B and 3-C.

 (drama CD)

The head of the first dormitory and the Karate Club, Megumi has a fierce exterior but also has a heart of gold. He was the one who discovered Mizuki's true gender towards the end of the series; along with him, the other two dormitory heads learn of the secret, although Minami claims that he had his suspicions for a long time. He is also Kanna's fiancé.

He was portrayed by Yuma Ishigaki in the Japanese drama adaptation and Zhang Hao Ming in the Taiwanese drama adaptation. In the 2011 version of the drama, Tennoji is portrayed by Mitsushima Shinnosuke. In the Korean adaptation, he is portrayed by Yoo Min-kyu.

 (drama CD)

Tennoji's deputy in the Karate Club, Itsuki has a friendly exterior, but when angered, is feared by almost everyone. Initially, Mizuki has a poor impression of him, but he really is a nice guy. At the school dance between Osaka High and Saint Blossom, Kujo appears as Kadoma's date, and during the previous rehearsals had acted as Kadoma's dance partner.

When the pipes burst in the first dormitory, he stays with Nakatsu and Kayashima, an event that proves rather scarring for Nakatsu especially as the students of the first dormitory has a tradition of washing their roommate's back.

 (drama CD)

A young first-year student in the Karate Club, who at one point shares a room with Sano and Ashiya. Earlier in the story, he was also responsible for luring Mizuki to a secluded area in the school, so that rogue members of the Karate Club could imprison her and keep her out of the 2,000 meter relay. However, he felt extremely guilty about this and told Kujo and Sano where she was.

He idolizes Kujo just like how Mizuki idolizes Sano. He desperately wants to be more manly, and joined the Karate Club to become so; but he also admits to Mizuki that he really became attracted to karate because he saw Kujo practicing and thought he looked so beautiful.

In the 2011 version of the drama, he is portrayed by Okayama Tomoki.

Students of the Second Dormitory
Classes that belong to this dormitory are 1-B, 2-C and 3-A.

 (drama CD)

Mizuki Ashiya is the female protagonist of the series. She admired Izumi Sano the moment she saw him high jump on TV. She disguises herself as a boy in order to enroll herself into Sano's school, Osaka Gakuen which allows her to get closer with Sano. She loves sweet food and she is a very fast runner, initially causing all the three dorms in Osaka High to desperately recruit her.

Mizuki falls in love with Sano, but is unable to tell him because she thinks that he doesn't know that she's a girl, though unbeknownst to her Sano knows her true gender and feels the same way about her. (It seems another reason she went there is because when she was going to watch him jump at that location, a gang of thugs tried to hurt her but Sano saved her. But when he tried to climb over a wired fence, one of them cut him with a knife on his heel.)
She wants to be a dog trainer and is very close to Sano's dog, Yūjirō. She has an older half-brother named,  who works as a doctor. He was portrayed by Yoshinori Okada in the Japanese drama adaptation, JJ Lin in the Taiwanese drama adaptation, and Julien Kang in the Korean adaptation.

She was portrayed by Maki Horikita in the Japanese drama adaptation and Ella Chen in the Taiwanese drama adaptation. In the 2011 version of the drama, she is portrayed by Maeda Atsuko. In the Korean drama adaptation, To The Beautiful You, Mizuki is portrayed by Sulli Choi.

 (drama CD)

Izumi Sano is the male protagonist of the series. He hates all sweet things and is an excellent high jumper. Before entering high school, he stopped jumping for personal reasons. He found out Mizuki's true gender due to her clumsiness in an accident early in the series. He didn't tell anyone else about Mizuki being a girl and becomes protective of her because of this.

Before Mizuki's arrival, Sano had been injured in an accident when he saved his team captain from being hit by a car, causing him to quit high jumping for a while because he thought that he couldn't handle the pressure. As the series goes on, Sano is aware of Mizuki's support for his jumping and starts to fall for her, but couldn't tell her because he feared that she would have to leave if she knew that he had found out her secret.

He was portrayed by Shun Oguri in the Japanese drama adaptation and Wu Zun in the Taiwanese drama adaptation. In the 2011 version of the drama, he is portrayed by Nakamura Aoi. In the Korean drama adaptation, To The Beautiful You, Sano is portrayed by Choi Minho.

 (drama CD)

Nakatsu is one of the students living in the second dormitory. He likes Mizuki but he doesn't know that she is really a girl with some of his classmates believe that he is homosexual due to that. At times, he is very jealous of Sano because of how close he is to Mizuki. He entered the school with a soccer scholarship, and is very good at it.

Originally from Ōsaka, he has a thick Kansai accent and frequently uses the Kansai dialect. He has bleached blonde hair. His name is taken from Nakatsu Station, a railway station located in Kita-ku, Osaka.

He was portrayed by Toma Ikuta in the Japanese drama adaptation and Jiro Wang in the Taiwanese drama adaptation. In the 2011 version of the drama, he is portrayed by Miura Shohei. In the Korean drama adaptation, To The Beautiful You, Nakatsu is portrayed by Lee Hyun Woo.

 (drama CD)

The head of dormitory for the second dormitory. He is a nephew of Hokuto Umeda, the school's doctor. He is the one year older than Mizuki. He's a "ladies man" although very sensible. He was once in love with his tutor, Kanako Tanabe, but she left him. Umeda claims that this was what caused Nanba to become the "ladies man" he is today. In the last chapter, it is said that he became a model.

He's also a former winner of the Miss Osaka pageant during his first year at Osaka, a fact which he isn't terribly proud of. His name is taken from Namba Station, located in Minami, a region in Chuo-ku, Ōsaka.

He was portrayed by Hiro Mizushima in the Japanese drama adaptation and Danson Tang in the Taiwanese drama adaptation. In the 2011 version of the drama, Nanba is portrayed by Renn Kiriyama and Seo Jun-young in the Korean adaptation.

 (drama CD)

Kayashima is Nakatsu's roommate and has the ability to see ghosts and detect auras. When he first comes to Osaka High, he was teased by others due to his ability to see spirits and auras. However, Nakatsu sees him as a good friend. His dream is to meditate on Mount Fuji though he really plans on going to college to study folklore after he graduates from Osaka High. Kayashima was aware of Mizuki's true gender since first meeting her (apparently, girls have pink auras). He didn't say anything because he believed that she had a good reason for pretending to be a boy.

In volume 4, Nakajo noted that Kayashima took his name from the Kayashima Station, a railway station on the Keihan Main Line, located in Neyagawa-shi. He also claimed that many workers were injured during the construction of the station, as a large tree was considered to be cut down. The tree was later preserved, and the station was built around it. Incidentally, "Taiki" means "large tree".

He was portrayed by Yusuke Yamamoto in the Japanese drama adaptation, Hsie He-hsian in the Taiwanese drama adaptation and Infinite's L in the Korean adaptation. In the 2011 version of the drama, Kayashima is portrayed by Yanagishita Tomo

 (drama CD)

Noe is a part of Mizuki's group of friends and is often seen together with his bi-spectacled friend, Sekime. Unlike most of their friends, the duo are locals. He is the first of the group to get a girlfriend named Erika from St. Blossom.

He also has an extreme fear of ghost and scary creatures and gets scared when Kayashima talks about these things. In the special chapter, he's said to have found a job in an anime production company. Like Kayashima, Noe is a station on the Keihan Main Line.

He was portrayed by Shunji Igarashi in the Japanese drama adaptation and Chen Wen Xiang in the Taiwanese drama adaptation. In the 2011 version of the drama, Noe is portrayed by Suzuki Katsuhiro

Like Noe, he is also a part of Mizuki's group of friends and was often seen together with Shinji Noe. He is the captain of the track team and got married with his high school sweetheart, Rie. They had a child together. Sekime is also a name of a station on the Keihan Main Line.

He was portrayed by Masaki Okada in the Japanese drama adaptation and Xie Zheng Hao in the Taiwanese drama adaptation. In the 2011 version of the drama, Sekime is portrayed by Yamada Shintaro

 (drama CD)

A first-year like Mizuki who harbours a serious crush on Nanba. Initially, he was secretive about being in love with Nanba, but eventually became less subtle. Towards the end of the series, he confesses his feelings to Nanba, but he was rejected. He would even attack the girls that tried to flirt with Nanba. Nakao was the school idol before Mizuki arrived and considers himself to be very beautiful. He hates mushrooms, although he ate them when Nanba asked him to. He's also the winner of the Miss Osaka pageant during his first year at Osaka Gakuen.

His name is taken from Senri-Chūō Station, a railway station of Kita-Osaka Kyūkō Line and Osaka Monorail, located in Toyonaka, Ōsaka.

He was portrayed by Ryō Kimura in the Japanese drama adaptation and Yang Hao Wei in the Taiwanese drama adaptation. In the 2011 version of the drama, Nakao is portrayed by Nishii Yukito and Hwang Kwang-hee in the Korean adaptation.

Students of the Third Dormitory
Classes that belong to this dormitory are 1-C, 2-A and 3-B.

 (drama CD)

Himejima is the leader of the third dormitory. Masao is shown to be a narcissist as well a Germanophile. He calls himself Oscar M. Himejima and spouting random German phrases. He dyed his hair and wears blue contacts. However, he has his serious side of himself where it was seen when the dormitory heads realised Mizuki's true gender. He has two younger brothers who are twins, Shion and Anri.

Like many other characters in the series, his name is taken from Himejima Station, a railway station of Hanshin Line, located in Nishiyodogawa-ku, Ōsaka.

In the original Japanese drama he was portrayed by Kyo Nobuo and in the 2011 version of the drama, Himejima is portrayed by Hidenori Tokuyama. He is portrayed by Andy Gong in the Taiwanese version and Kim Ian in the Korean adaptation.

The Umeda family

Io is the eldest sister of the Umeda family as well to Rio and Hokuto. She is the mother of Minami Nanba. She discovers Mizuki's secret during the summer job that she offered to Mizuki, Sano and Nakatsu while she's changing out of her clothes and later provides Mizuki with more comfortable vests to cover up her developing body.

She was portrayed by Yōko Moriguchi in the Japanese drama adaptation and Guo Chin Chun in the Taiwanese drama adaptation.

 (drama CD)

The doctor at the school's nurse office. He knows that Mizuki is a girl, gives her advice, and pretty much acts like a mentor to her. Umeda is homosexual. He is the uncle of Minami Nanba and brother to both Io and Rio. He is also in love with one of his old friends, Ryoichi Kijima from high school. Karasuma, the reporter who constantly reporting about Sano is very terrified of him, as he accidentally choked her without realising it. He has a tendency to kick people in the head and call them stupid.

He was portrayed by Takaya Kamikawa in the Japanese drama adaptation and Tang Zhi Ping in the Taiwanese drama adaptation. In the 2011 version of the drama, Umeda is portrayed by Takumi Saito. In the Korean adaptation, he is portrayed by Ki Tae Young.

Rio is Hokuto's younger sister and is about the same age as Mizuki. She goes to St. Blossom High School. She doesn't like to admit the fact that she's Minami's aunt considering that he is two years older than she is, so she asks Mizuki to keep their relation a secret and instead say that they are cousins. She is quite picky about the men she wants to be with as she has grown up with a handsome father, brother and nephew. Rio was a friend of Julia's while she attended Saint Blossom as an exchange student.

She was not present in the Japanese drama adaptation but Cai Han Cen portrayed her in the Taiwanese drama adaptation.

Azuma is the father of Io, Hokuto and Rio as well being the grandfather of Minami. Azuma is fifty-four but looks younger. Mizuki notes upon first meeting them that he and his wife look no older than Hokuto. Azuma attended the Christmas Dance with Seira where they won the best couple award.

Seira is the mother to Io, Hokuto and Rio and grandmother to Minami. Like her husband Seira looks young even though she is fifty-one years old. She partnered with Azuma during the Christmas Dance party and won the best couple award with Azuma. It is implied that Io and Seira used to clash when Io was younger, making Seira cry on more than one occasion. Their friction subsided during the birth of Minami when Seira demanded that Io not give into the pain of childbirth, after which their relationship improved.

Other supporting characters

 (drama CD)

He is a photographer and Hokuto's junior back during his days at Osaka Gakuen. Akiha likes to be around Umeda, something even Umeda doesn't appreciate. He is bisexual, once claiming that he loves all beautiful people regardless of gender. He was married to Ebi, his model and eventual make up artist, but they divorced because he kept her at arm's length, never letting her in and he had a "void" inside of him that, try as she might, she just couldn't fill.

Ebi says that this may have been because he was abandoned by his mother when he was little, giving him severe trust issues. However she does state that they still love each other and are like brother and sister. This is proved later when instead of jumping to her defense, as Mizuki wanted to, when she is verbally abused by a model for accidentally sending off the outfits for the next shoot, Akiha trusts her and lets her handle it herself. He later says he did that because sometimes it's better to respect people and believe in them rather than trying to solve their problems for them. He, like Mizuki loves sweet things, even eating nothing but sweet red beans for breakfast on one of his shoots.

His name is taken from Akihabara, one of the districts in Chiyoda, Tokyo.

Izumi Sano's younger brother and a high jumper. He and Izumi were close when they were young. As Sano never contacted Shin after leaving the family, Shin felt forgotten and began to resent Izumi. He also used to be a delinquent for a while because of his older brother's leaving but they got into friendly terms again. He is actually not a bad kid, and really admires his older brother. He does not like onions. It is also implied that he may have some sort of feelings for Mizuki, since at the end of Chapter 106, he said that he would be back "after I gain my confidence and able to beat Brother" to tell her. What that is remains unknown, but Izumi feels a chill after Shin has said that.

He is portrayed by Shunsuke Daito in the Japanese adaptation.

He attends Tōkyō High School with Sano's younger brother, Shin. He is a high jumper and Sano's rival. He is always teasing Sano and Mizuki.

He is portrayed by Yu Shirota in the Japanese adaptation and Ethan Juan in the Taiwanese drama. In the 2011 version he is portrayed by Yuki Sato and by Kang Ha Neul in the Korean adaptation.

Julia is Mizuki's best friend from America and came to Japan as an exchange student to study for a month. She finds out that Sano knows that Mizuki's a girl and tried to trick Mizuki's classmates into thinking that she and Mizuki are lovers to gauge Sano's feelings for Mizuki. Nakatsu, jealous that Julia is close to Mizuki, takes a strong dislike in her and vice versa, calling him 'Monkey Boy'. It is hinted that she may have feelings for Nakatsu.

She was portrayed by Minami Hinase in the Japanese drama adaptation and Nissa Marion in the Taiwanese drama adaptation.

Mizuki's friend when she ran away from home and is also Mizuki's first love. Mizuki fainted from hunger so he took her home and gave her a place to stay. He was her first love and they almost kissed. As he was born with a hole in his lungs, he cannot do strenuous exercise or go to high altitudes. The operation to cure his birth defect was very risky and refused at the start but he did do the surgery after meeting Mizuki.

After the surgery, he climbs the mountains he loves and later appears in Berkeley while Mizuki is visiting her family. He shows that he might have feelings for Mizuki. He is modeled after Leonardo DiCaprio.

References

Hana Kimi